Roy Powell (born 2 October 1965 in Langham, Rutland) is a British jazz pianist.

Biography 
His mother was a historian. His father was a scientist who moved the family from Rutland to Canada. When Powell was ten, the family returned to England, settling in Hayfield, Derbyshire. He had been playing piano for five years after receiving lessons from his father. He attended New Mills Grammar School at the same time as Lloyd Cole. In the 1970s, when other teenagers were listening to The Clash and The Sex Pistols, Powell was listening to Duke Ellington and Miles Davis and buying albums through the mail from America. He attended the Royal Northern College of Music, studying piano and classical composition during the day and playing in Manchester jazz clubs at night. In 1992 he was a member of the Creative Jazz Orchestra. Three years later he moved to Norway.

Powell has been a member of the group InterStatic with Jacob Young, and Jarle Vespestad, and the group Naked Truth with Lorenzo Feliciati, Pat Mastelotto, and Graham Haynes. He recorded the album Mumpbeak with Feliciati, Mastelotto, Bill Laswell, Tony Levin, and Shanir Ezra Blumenkranz. On the album Powell plays Hohner Clavinet through guitar effect pedals and amps.

Discography
 A Big Sky (Totemic)
 Holus (Resonant, 1999)
 North by Northwest (Nagel Heyer, 2001)
 Solace (Nagel Heyer, 2003)
 Peak Experience Trio (Totemic, 2006)
 Rendezvous: Live in London (Nagel Heyer, 2007)
 Holy Abyss (Cuneiform, 2012)
 Anthem (PVY, 2011)
 Shizaru (RareNoise) with Cuong Vu, Lorenzo Feliciati, and Pat Mastelotto
 InterStatic (RareNoise) with Jacob Young and Jarle Vespestad
 Ouroboros (RareNoise) with Graham Haynes, Lorenzo Feliciati and Pat Mastelotto
 Mumpbeak (RareNoise) with Bill Laswell, Tony Levin, Pat Mastelotto, Shanir Blumenkrantz and Lorenzo Feliciati
 Arise InterStatic (RareNoise) with Jacob Young and Jarle Vespestad
 Avian Thug (RareNoise) with Graham Haynes, Lorenzo Feliciati and Pat Mastelotto
 Mumpbeak Tooth (RareNoise) with Lorenzo Feliciati and Torstein Lofthus

References

External links 
 Official website
 National jazz organization in the UK

1965 births
Living people
British jazz pianists
Jazz organists
Resonant Music artists
RareNoiseRecords artists
People from Rutland
21st-century pianists
21st-century organists
Nagel-Heyer Records artists
Cuneiform Records artists